The Ichetucknee siltsnail, also known as the sand grain snail, scientific name Floridobia mica,  is a species of small freshwater snail, an aquatic gastropod in the family Hydrobiidae. This species is endemic to the United States.

References

Molluscs of the United States
Floridobia
Hydrobiidae
Gastropods described in 1968
Taxonomy articles created by Polbot